In algebraic geometry, Fay's trisecant identity is an identity between theta functions of Riemann surfaces introduced by . Fay's identity holds for theta functions of Jacobians of curves, but not for theta functions of general abelian varieties.

Statement

Suppose that
C is a compact Riemann surface
g is the genus of C
θ is the Riemann theta function of C, a function from Cg to C
E is a prime form on C×C
u,v,x,y are points of C
z is an element of Cg
ω is a 1-form on C with values in Cg

The Fay's identity states that

with

References

Abelian varieties
Riemann surfaces
Mathematical identities
Theta functions